The 2020 Hawthorn Football Club season was the club's 96th season in the Australian Football League and 119th overall, the 21st season playing home games at the Melbourne Cricket Ground, the 20th season playing home games at the University of Tasmania Stadium, the 16th season under head coach Alastair Clarkson, and the 2nd season with Ben Stratton as club captain. With Jarryd Roughead and Grant Birchall departing this season will be the first to not have any player from Hawthorn's 2008 premiership team on the list.

On 16 March 2020, AFL CEO Gillon McLachlan announced that the season would be shortened to 17 games due to the COVID-19 pandemic. During Hawthorn's round 1 match with the Brisbane Lions, it was announced that the season would be suspended following the conclusion of the round, with the suspension to last until 31 May 2020. The season recommenced on 11 June 2020. Due to COVID-19, Hawthorn would only play two matches at the Melbourne Cricket Ground, and no matches at the University of Tasmania Stadium. From round 13 until the end of the season, the Hawks would base themselves in the Barossa Valley in South Australia, playing home games at the Adelaide Oval.

A 10–point loss to Port Adelaide in round 13 meant that Hawthorn would fail to win 10 games in a season since 2009.

Hawthorn finished in fifteenth–place with a 5–12 record. Meaning for the first time since 2006 the club would fail to qualify for finals in consecutive seasons. This was also the first time since 2005, Hawthorn would finish in the bottom four.

Club summary 
The 2020 AFL season was the 124th season of the VFL/AFL competition since its inception in 1897; having entered the competition in 1925, it was the 96th season contested by the Hawthorn Football Club. Tasmania and iiNet continued as the club's two major sponsors, as they have done since 2006 and 2013 respectively, while Adidas continued to manufacture the club's on-and-off field apparel, as they have done since 2013. Hawthorn continued its alignment with the Box Hill Hawks Football Club in the Victorian Football League, however due to COVID–19, the VFL season was cancelled.

Senior personnel 
On 26 August 2019, the club announced that assistant coach Darren Glass would be leaving the club to join West Coast as the club's list manager. A couple of days laters it was announced that former assistant coach and Carlton coach, Brendon Bolton would return to the club as director of coaching. On 23 May 2020, Due to the COVID-19 pandemic, The club was forced to stand down all but 25 staff members. This included head of development and learning Damian Carroll, VFL coach Max Bailey, VFLW coach Bec Goddard and development coaches Torin Baker, Marco Bello and Brett Deledio.

Playing list changes

Trades

Free agency

Additions

Departures

Draft

AFL draft

Rookie draft

Retirements and delistings

2020 player squad

Marsh Community series

Home & Away season

Ladder

Awards, records and milestones

Awards
Club Awards
 Peter Crimmins Medal: Jack Gunston
 Most consistent player: Jack Gunston
 Most improved player: Jack Scrimshaw
 Best clubman: Paul Puopolo
 Best first year player (debut season): Will Day

Records

Club records 
 Most tackles: 1,288 – Liam Shiels
 Most goal assists: 199 – Luke Breust
 Most games coached: 368 – Alastair Clarkson
 Most victories coached: 221 – Alastair Clarkson
 Most home and away games coached: 342 – Alastair Clarkson
 Most home and away victories coached: 205 – Alastair Clarkson

Milestones
Round 1
 Tim O'Brien – 50th AFL goal.
 Sam Frost – Hawthorn debut.
 Jonathon Patton – Hawthorn debut.
 Jonathon Patton – 1st goal for Hawthorn.

Round 3
 Jack Gunston – 350th goal for Hawthorn.
 Chad Wingard – 250th AFL goal.
 Jaeger O'Meara – 50th game for Hawthorn.

Round 4
 Tom Mitchell – 50th game for Hawthorn.

Round 5
 Harrison Jones – AFL debut.

Round 6
 Will Day – AFL debut.
 Josh Morris – AFL debut.

Round 7
 Darren Minchington – Hawthorn debut.
 Josh Morris – 1st AFL goal.

Round 8
 Jack Gunston – 200th AFL game.
 Keegan Brooksby – Hawthorn debut.

Round 9
 Luke Breust – 400th AFL goal.
 Sam Frost – 100th AFL game.
 Jaeger O'Meara – 100th AFL game.
 Will Day – 1st AFL goal.

Round 13
 Shaun Burgoyne – 300th AFL goal.
 Ben Stratton – 200th AFL game.
 Michael Hartley – Hawthorn debut.

Round 14
 Darren Minchington – 1st goal for Hawthorn.

Round 16
 Damon Greaves – AFL debut.

Round 17
 Finn Maginness – AFL debut.

Round 18
 James Frawley – 100th game for Hawthorn.

References 

Hawthorn Football Club Season, 2020
Hawthorn Football Club seasons